Deyangshar is the name given to the central open courtyard of a monastery in Tibet and parts of Myanmar where it is used for ceremonies, burning incense and prayer and to divide the living quarters from the temples of Buddhist prayer and study. One such example is the Potala Palace of the Dalai Lama in Lhasa, where the great palacial monastery is divided into a white and a red palace with a yellow painted Deyangshar separating to two sectors.

Tibetan Buddhist monasteries